A list of films produced in Hong Kong in 1984.

1984

References

External links
 IMDB list of Hong Kong films
 Hong Kong films of 1984 at HKcinemamagic.com

1984
Lists of 1984 films by country or language
1984 in Hong Kong